Kumba, also known as Sate and Yofo, is an Adamawa language of Nigeria.

References

Languages of Nigeria
Mumuye–Yendang languages